The 2006 Miami Hurricanes baseball team represented the University of Miami in the 2006 NCAA Division I baseball season. The Hurricanes played their home games at Mark Light Field. The team was coached by Jim Morris in his thirteenth season at Miami.  Playing in the Atlantic Coast Conference's Coastal Division, they finished in fourth place in their division with a record of 17–13, 42–24 overall.

Personnel

Roster

Coaches

Schedule and results

References

Miami Hurricanes baseball seasons
Miami Hurricanes
College World Series seasons
Miami
Miami Hurricanes baseball